Cheragh Mazraeh (also Romanized as Cherāgh Mazra‘eh; also known as Chirāgh Mazreh) is a village in Aq Bolagh Rural District, Sojas Rud District, Khodabandeh County, Zanjan Province, Iran. At the 2006 census, its population was 109, in 23 families.

References 

Populated places in Khodabandeh County